Carex accrescens is a species of sedge that was first described by Jisaburo Ohwi in 1931. It is native to eastern Asia, from Siberia to the Korean Peninsula and Japan.

References

accrescens
Flora of Asia
Plants described in 1931